Dayom Panthrandum is a 2013 Malayalam-language Indian feature film directed by Harshad, starring Abu, Ukru D Poshini, Manish Acharya, Lukman, Akhil V and Shinto Stanley. The film was released on 10 October 2013.

Plot
The film shares several characteristics with the game such as its unpredictability, adventure, thrill - all rolled into one. The film is about a group of youngsters who set out on a mission. They travel far and wide. While four of them are in a car, the 'Boss' of the group is on a bike, alone, as if expecting a pillion rider at any moment. They meet a tribal man who falls in their focus as well as their camera's. The new entrant guides them to new twists and turns. He guides them from the ease and comfort of film making to the harshness of reality which the forest unfolds.

Cast
Abu as Boss
Ukru D Poshini as Muthoran
Lukman Avaran as Red
Manish Acharya as Oscar
Akhil V as Sufi
Shinto Stanley as Chatterji

References

External links
 Dayom Panthrandum on   Asianet News

2010s Malayalam-language films
2013 films